is a Japanese animation company who has created content for MTV Japan.

Works
 Hal & Bons (2002)
 Usavich (2006)
 New Hal & Bons (2006)
 Petite Eva (2007)
 Yan Yan Machiko (2009)
 Usavich Zero (2015)
 Inazma Delivery (2017)
 Bromance (2017 possibly) Worked with Ubisoft

References

External links
 Kanaban Graphics website 

Japanese animation studios